Pachnephorus fasciatus is a species of leaf beetle found in western, central and southern Africa. It was first described by the Belgian entomologist  in 1941.

Subspecies
There are two subspecies of P. fasciatus:
 Pachnephorus fasciatus fasciatus Burgeon, 1941: The nominotypical subspecies. Distributed in Cameroon, Central African Republic, Gabon, the Democratic Republic of the Congo and Angola.
 Pachnephorus fasciatus occidentalis Zoia, 2007: Distributed in Senegal, Gambia, Guinea Bissau, Sierra Leone and Nigeria. The subspecies name refers to the subspecies occurring in an occidental (western) region, compared to the area the nominal subspecies is found in.

References

Eumolpinae
Beetles of the Democratic Republic of the Congo
Insects of Cameroon
Insects of the Central African Republic
Insects of Gabon
Insects of Angola
Insects of West Africa
Beetles described in 1941